Sibsey is a village, civil parish and electoral ward in the East Lindsey district of Lincolnshire, England. Sibsey Northlands is to the north of the village. The Prime Meridian passes just to the west of Sibsey, crossing the Stone Bridge Drain canal. At the 2001 census, Sibsey had a population of 1,996, reducing to 1,979 at the 2011 Census.

Set in the fens of Lincolnshire, Sibsey is a focus of the farming community. The village is surrounded by farmland. The village won an award for best-kept village in 1989. The village has a village hall, a post office with shop, and a public house, the White Hart, on Main Road. Although the postal address for residences includes nearby Boston, it is not in that borough.

Demography

Landmarks

The Sibsey Trader Mill
Sibsey's most prominent feature is the Grade I listed  and scheduled Sibsey Trader Mill. This six-storey windmill, which was built to replace an earlier post mill, has six sails and was completed in 1877 by Sanderson and Son of Louth. In 1954 it ceased working under wind-power, and fell into disuse. It was restored to working order with engine-driven mill stones in 1981, and is under the guardianship of English Heritage. It is still in operation.

The mill should not be confused with a non-working red brick Grade II listed windmill on the eastern side of the A16.

St Margaret's Church
The medieval church, made up of work from the 12th to 16th centuries, is a Grade I listed building, and is dedicated to Saint Margaret. The church has a square, Early English Period tower at the western end. It was completely restored in 1840, and the chancel rebuilt and nave and aisles partly rebuilt in 1855.  The remains of the churchyard cross, located near the porch, is Grade II listed, and a scheduled monument.  Today it is part of a group of parishes, Sibsey with Frithville, with a varied pattern of worship and community activity across three parish churches. The churchyard has an avenue of lime trees and parts are set aside as wildlife sanctuary.

Transport
In 1848 the East Lincolnshire Railway opened Sibsey railway station, which closed in 1961.  The Grantham to Skegness Line passes still close to the south-east of the village with level crossings over the B1184 and A16.

Education
Although now maintained by Lincolnshire County Council, the primary school had a long history as an independent, locally supported institution. Founded in 1733, the school spent a century in leased accommodation before being rebuilt in 1869 – a structure that lasted until the school was largely rebuilt in 1996.

Notable people
Frank Bramley, the post-impressionist artist, and Arthur Lucan, comic actor, were born at Sibsey. Annie Besant, the social reformer and Theosophist lived at Sibsey during her marriage to Rev. Frank Besant. Alec Brader, professional footballer, schoolteacher and youth athletics coach lived at Sibsey.

See also
 Hilldyke, Lincolnshire
 Sibsey Rural District

References

External links

 Free Primary School
 RAF Lincolnshire
 Parish council
 Official Website of Sibsey Trader Windmill
Sibsey Roll of Honour

Villages in Lincolnshire
Civil parishes in Lincolnshire
East Lindsey District